Hurtcore, a portmanteau of the words "hardcore" and "hurt", is a name given to a particularly extreme form of child pornography, usually involving degrading violence, bodily harm and murder relating to child sexual abuse. The material is usually so extreme, even most pedophiles have been said to be repulsed by this genre of pornography and condemn its topic in most discussions. Eileen Ormsby, Australian writer and author of The Darkest Web, described hurtcore as "a fetish for people who get aroused by the infliction of pain, or even torture, on another person who is not a willing participant". An additional motivation for the perpetrator, next to their position of power over their victim(s), can be the reaction of their victim(s) to the physical abuse, like crying or screaming of pain. This reaction can stimulate the arousal of the perpetrator even more.

Some dark web forums are dedicated to the discussion, and the sharing of images and videos, of hurtcore. In 2013, Vice called Hurt2theCore" "the dark web's most notorious hurtcore site", run by Matthew Graham, who became known as the "King of Hurtcore" and "one of the biggest child pornography and hurtcore distributors in the world".

The case of Matthew Falder was the UK National Crime Agency's first successful hurtcore prosecution.

See also
 Cybersex trafficking
 Dark web
 Livestreamed crime
 Snuff film

References

External links
 Inside the Repulsive World of 'Hurtcore', the Worst Crimes Imaginable at Vice
 'Lux' and the child pornography crimes too awful to print at The Age

Pornography
Pedophilia
Violence
Dark web
Child pornography
Child abuse
Sexual fetishism
Cruelty
Torture
Violent crime
Rape